Muddina Maava (English Translation: Beloved father-in-law) is a Kannada language feature film released in 1993, starring Shashi Kumar, Shruti, S. P. Balasubrahmanyam and Tara. The film is a remake of the Tamil film Naan Pudicha Mappillai.

Cast
 Shashi Kumar
 Shruti as Lakshmi
 S. P. Balasubrahmanyam as Ramaiah, Lakshmi's father
 Tara
 Doddanna as Vishakantaiah
 Dwarakish
 Girija Lokesh
 M. N. Lakshmi Devi

Soundtrack
The film's soundtrack was composed by S. P. Balasubrahmanyam.
Lyrics for all the soundtrack for this film were penned by Hamsalekha.

References

External links

1993 films
1990s Kannada-language films
Kannada remakes of Tamil films
Films scored by S. P. Balasubrahmanyam
Films directed by Sai Prakash